Gaspard Jean-Baptiste Brunet (14 June 1734 – 15 November 1793) commanded the French Army of Italy during the French Revolutionary Wars and was executed during the Reign of Terror. Despite this fate his son Jean Baptiste Brunet also became a French general. From the minor nobility, he entered the French Royal Army as a gunner in 1755, transferred to an infantry unit and fought in the Seven Years' War. He received the Order of Saint-Louis and was promoted to lieutenant colonel in 1779.

He became maréchal de camp (general of brigade) in 1791 and served in the Army of Italy under Jacques Bernard d'Anselme in 1792. After a brief stint as interim army commander in the winter of 1792–93, he was promoted general of division and assumed the duties of commander-in-chief from May to August 1793. His defeat at Saorgio and the suspicions of the all-powerful representatives on mission caused him to be arrested, imprisoned and guillotined.

BRUNET is one of the names inscribed under the Arc de Triomphe, on Column 23.

References

French generals
French military personnel of the Seven Years' War
French military personnel of the French Revolutionary Wars
French Republican military leaders of the French Revolutionary Wars
People executed by guillotine during the French Revolution
Names inscribed under the Arc de Triomphe
1734 births
1793 deaths